Pierre Yver (born 23 July 1947) is a French racing driver.

Racing record

24 Hours of Le Mans results

References

1947 births
Living people
French racing drivers
24 Hours of Le Mans drivers
World Sportscar Championship drivers

Oreca drivers
Larbre Compétition drivers